Bleeding Heart Graffiti is the second album from Nina Gordon and marks her third album produced by Bob Rock. It peaked at #30 on Billboard's Top Heatseekers Album chart. Nine of the songs on the album are re-recorded tracks from Nina's self-shelved Even the Sunbeams album. The Time Comes was featured in the Bones episode The Priest in the Churchyard.

Track listing 
 "Bleeding Heart Graffiti" (Gordon) – 0:42
 "Christmas Lights" (Gordon) – 5:13
 "Kiss Me 'Til It Bleeds" (Gordon, Russo, Jaye) – 4:09
 "Suffragette" (Gordon, S. Melvoin, W. Melvoin) – 3:37
 "This Was the Year" (Gordon) – 0:32
 "Don't Let Me Down" (Gordon) – 4:14
 "Pure" (Gordon) – 4:29
 "Watercolors" (Gordon) – 3:25
 "Superstar" (Gordon) – 3:15
 "Turn on Your Radio" (Gordon) – 4:05
 "When You Don't Want Me Anymore" (Gordon) – 4:03
 "Bones and a Name" (Gordon) – 4:55
 "The Time Comes" (Gordon) – 4:19
 "The Crickets Sound Like Sleigh Bells" (Gordon) – 0:37
 "Tonight and the Rest of My Life [Acoustic Version](iTunes Bonus)" (Gordon) – 4:40

Personnel 

 Peter Bradley Adams – Piano
 Paul Bushnell – Bass
 Jamie Edwards – Guitar, Piano
 Josh Freese – Drums
 Eric Helmkamp – Engineer
 Jens – Mixing
 Abe Laboriel Jr. – Drums
 Wendy Melvoin – Bass, Guitar
 Tom Morello – Guitar
 Sean Nelson – Drums
 Melanie Nissen – Photography
 Chris Reynolds – Assistant Engineer
 Bob Rock – Guitar, Producer
 Jeff Russo – Bass, Guitar, Engineer
 Rachel Salmon – Illustrations
 Joel Shearer – Guitar
 Stephen Walker – Art Direction, Cover Layout
 Joey Waronker – Drums

Singles

Non-album tracks 
The only known b-side from this recording session is The Blue Hour, which has yet to get an official release, but was leaked to the Internet. Nina also put the demos for A Different Song, Down and Dirty and Someday Is Too Far Away on her official site, which are from this album's recording sessions.

References 

2006 albums
Albums produced by Bob Rock
Nina Gordon albums